|-

|-

|-

The Ukraine national bandy team is Ukraine's national representative in the sport of bandy. Two national teams exist, one for men and one for women. Both teams are organized by the Ukrainian Bandy and Rink bandy Federation. A national junior boys team has also competed internationally for Ukraine. This article deals chiefly with the men's senior national team. The national team's kit is in the Ukrainian colours of yellow and blue.

The Ukraine national men's bandy team made its debut at the 2013 Bandy World Championship. The Ukraine national women's bandy team was scheduled to make its world debut at the 2022 Women's Bandy World Championship but had to withdraw due to the 2022 Russian invasion of Ukraine. The women's team will make its next attempt to make its world debut at the 2023 Women's Bandy World Championship in Sweden.

History

The national team made its debut at the men's 2013 Bandy World Championship (XXXIIIrd), and also participated at the 2014 Bandy World Championship (XXXIVth). For the 2015 Bandy World Championship, the team withdrew for political reasons due to the conflict with Russia over Crimea. At the 2016 Bandy World Championship (XXXVIth) they returned, capturing bronze in Division B, currently the national team's best performance in history.

The men's national team did not participate in the 2022 Bandy World Championship which was to be the first time the men's tournament was to be held since the Covid-19 pandemic outbreak. The tournament was cancelled due to the unforeseen impact of the 2022 Russian invasion of Ukraine.

World Championship record

Seniors

The Ukraine national men's senior bandy team began competing in the Bandy World Championship making its debut at the 2013 Bandy World Championship. It did not compete in the 2015 or 2022 tournament.

Y15 Ukraine

Team Ukraine Senior

2013 Seniors

The Ukraine national bandy team competed in the 2013 Bandy World Championship in Division B with the following roster:

2014 Seniors
The Ukraine national bandy team competed in the 2014 Bandy World Championship in Division B with the following roster:

2015 Seniors
The Ukraine national bandy team did not compete in the 2015 Bandy World Championship. The national team withdrew from the tournament due to the conflict with Russia over Crimea.

2016 Seniors
The Ukraine national bandy team competed in the 2016 Bandy World Championship in Division B with the following roster:

2017 Seniors

The Ukraine national bandy team competed in the 2017 Bandy World Championship in Division B with the following roster:

2018 Seniors

The Ukraine national bandy team competed in the 2018 Bandy World Championship in Division B.

2019 Seniors

The Ukraine national bandy team competed in the 2019 Bandy World Championship in Division B.

2020 Seniors

The Ukraine national bandy team competed in the 2020 Bandy World Championship in Division B.

2021 Seniors

The Ukraine national bandy team did not compete in the 2021 Bandy World Championship because it was cancelled due to the Covid-19 pandemic.

2022 Seniors

The Ukraine national bandy team did not compete in the 2022 Bandy World Championship which was cancelled due to the Russian invasion of Ukraine.

Team Ukraine Junior

The Bandy World Championship for youth teams are held in a number of different age classes and are held regularly for athletes who do not compete for the national senior team. The following are the age classes for males:

 World Championship Y15 – for boys' teams up to age 15
 World Championship Y17 – for boys' teams up to age 17
 World Championship Y19 – for young men's teams up to age 19
 World Championship Y23 – for young men's teams up to age 23

The first World Championship Y16 was held in 1994. Since 2002, it has been for Y15 teams only.

2014 Y15

The following was the Ukrainian youth team squad for the 2014 Y15 Youth Bandy World Championship who finished in 4th place:

2015 Y15
The Ukraine national youth team did not compete in the 2015 Y15 Youth Bandy World Championship. The national Y15 team withdrew from the tournament due to the conflict with Russia over Crimea. The intended roster had been as follows:

 Yuri Vyborov (gk)	
 Arkadiy Nagoga	
 Kyrylo Shmatchenko	
 Sergei Smurov	
 Anton Riapolov	
 Kiril Dolgikh	
 Bogdan Arabov	
 Artur Sysoev	
 Evgenii Gromnitskii	
 Volodymyr Golets	
 Mykhaylo Skalyts`kyy	
 Maksym Melnychuk (gk)	
 Ivan Shvvedchenko	
 Bohdan Sukharov

2016 Y15

The Ukrainian youth team squad competed in the 2016 Y15 Youth Bandy World Championship.

2020 Y15

The 2020 World Championship Y15 tournament in Arkhangelsk, Russia, was cancelled.

Notable players
 , Suzdalev Yuriy Vasyliovych

Gallery

External links
 Ukrainian bandy and Rink Bandy Federation

References

Bandy
National bandy teams
Bandy in Ukraine